Margarete Metzner (née Klebe) was a German figure skater who competed in ladies' singles and pair skating.

With her husband, Paul Metzner, she won the bronze medal at the 1922 World Figure Skating Championships in Davos, Switzerland.

Competitive highlights

Singles (as Margarete Klebe)

Pairs 
With  Paul Metzner

* as Margarete Klebe
* as Margarete Metzner

References 

German female single skaters
German female pair skaters
Date of birth missing
Date of death missing